Candlepower (abbreviated as cp or CP) is a unit of measurement for luminous intensity. It expresses levels of light intensity relative to the light emitted by a candle of specific size and constituents. The historical candlepower is equal to 0.981 candelas. In modern usage, candlepower is sometimes used as a synonym for candela.

History
Spermaceti is a material from the heads of sperm whales, and was once used to make high-quality candles.

At the time the UK established candlepower as a unit, the French standard of light was based on the illumination from a Carcel burner. They defined the unit was that illumination that emanates from a lamp burning pure colza oil (obtained from the seed of the plant Brassica campestris) at a defined rate. Ten standard candles equaled about one Carcel burner.

In 1909, several agencies met to establish an international standard. It was attended by representatives of the Laboratoire Central de l’Electricité (France), the National Physical Laboratory (UK), the Bureau of Standards (United States), and the Physikalische Technische Reichsanstalt (Germany). The majority redefined the candle in term of an electric lamp with a carbon filament. The Germans, however, dissented and decided to use a definition equal to 9/10 of the output of a Hefner lamp.

In 1921, the Commission Internationale de l'Eclairage (International Commission for Illumination, commonly referred to as the CIE) redefined the international candle again in terms of a carbon filament incandescent lamp.

In 1937, the international candle was redefined again—against the luminous intensity of a blackbody at the freezing point of liquid platinum which was to be 58.9 international candles per square centimetre.

In 1948, the international unit (SI) candela replaced candlepower. One candlepower unit is about 0.981 candela. In general modern use, a candlepower now equates directly (1:1) to the number of candelas—an implicit increase from its old value.

Calibration of lamps
To measure the candlepower of a lamp, a person judged by eye the relative brightness of adjacent surfaces—one illuminated only by a standard lamp (or candle) and the other only by the lamp under test. They adjusted the distance of one of the lamps until the two surfaces appeared to be of equal brightness. Then they calculated the candlepower of the lamp under test from the two distances and the inverse square law.

Modern use
"Candlepower" is largely an obsolete term. However, people still sometimes use it to describe the luminous intensity of high powered flashlights and spotlights. Narrow-beamed lights of all sorts can have very high candlepower specifications, because candlepower measures the intensity of the light on a target, rather than the total amount of light it emits. A given lamp has a higher candlepower rating if its light is more tightly focused.

Candlepower is still used today in law. For example, it is presently used in the California Vehicle Code to define the legal requirements for headlamps and other lamps, including accessory lamps.

Only a few artificial light sources, such as military photoflash bombs, have the very high candlepower ratings characteristic of narrow-beamed spotlights but, simultaneously, a wide unfocused distribution of light.

See also
 Candela
 List of obsolete units of measurement
 Lumen (unit)

Notes and references

Further reading
 
 International candle at Sizes.com Last revised: 27 June 2007. Accessed July 2007
 Candle History - Candlepower 2003 Bob Sherman at Craftcave. Accessed July 2007.
 Brief History Of Lighting 2004 by The Wolfstone Group.  Accessed July 2007.
 A History of Light and Lighting by Bill Williams Edition: 2.3 - (2005) Accessed July 2007.
 
 

Candles
Units of luminous intensity
Lighting
Obsolete units of measurement